The Asa Waters Mansion is an historic mansion at 123 Elm Street in Millbury, Massachusetts.  Designed by architect Asher Benjamin for Asa Waters and Susan Holman Waters, the mansion was built between 1826 and 1832, It is a three-story wood-frame house, with a hip roof ringed by a low balustrade. Its front facade is distinguished by colonnade of fluted two-story pillars with composite capitals, with pilasters at the building corners. The Millbury Historical Society is headquartered there, and the Mansion is used as an event space for public and private organizations and individuals.

The building was listed on the National Register of Historic Places in 1978.

See also
 National Register of Historic Places listings in Worcester County, Massachusetts

References

External links

 

Houses completed in 1832
Asher Benjamin buildings
Houses on the National Register of Historic Places in Worcester County, Massachusetts
Houses in Worcester County, Massachusetts
Buildings and structures in Millbury, Massachusetts